Grāveri  is a place name in Latvia that may refer to:

Settlements 

 Grāveri, Aglona Municipality
 Grāveri, Alsunga Municipality
 Grāveri, Līvāni Municipality

See also 
 Grāveri Parish